Yevhen Kotyun (born 31 July 1996) is a professional Ukrainian football midfielder who plays for the amateur Ukrainian club Bohun Brody.

Career
Kotyun is a product of the FC Volyn Youth Sportive School System. Then he signed a professional contract with FC Volyn Lutsk in the Ukrainian Premier League, spent before some time as player in FC Laska Boratyn amateur team.

He made his debut in the Ukrainian Premier League for FC Volyn on 26 November 2016, playing in the match against FC Dynamo Kyiv.

References

External links
Profile at Official FFU Site (Ukr)

Living people
1996 births
Footballers from Lutsk
Ukrainian footballers
Association football midfielders
Ukrainian Premier League players
FC Volyn Lutsk players
FC Podillya Khmelnytskyi players
Sportspeople from Volyn Oblast